Lorenzo Mattotti (born 24 January 1954) is an Italian comics artist as well as an illustrator. His illustrations have been published in magazines such as Cosmopolitan, Vogue, The New Yorker, Le Monde and Vanity Fair. In comics, Mattotti won an Eisner Award in 2003 for his Dr Jekyll & Mr Hyde graphic novel.

Biography

Mattotti was born in Brescia (Lombardy).

He studied architecture when he was young, but did not finish the course. Instead he became a comics artist. After a few traditional comic stories he decided he wanted to tell different kinds of stories and portray these in a different style.

Il Signor Spartaco was the first comic made under this ambition. The story centred on the dreams of a train passenger making it possible for Mattotti to use forms and colors in a way previously unseen in the classic French-Belgian comic world. He focused more on the inner world of his characters and the total absence of an adventure was also a radical change in the comics universe.

Mattotti is mainly inspired by painters, musicians, writers and directors. To him, the relation between text and image should be the same as with text and music. The two should enrich each other. Unusually, in Mattotti's comics the text illustrates the illustration instead of the other way around. He always makes sure the text has enough freedom for multiple interpretations.

With Fires (1986) Mattotti made his name in the comics world. The story revolves around the struggle between nature and civilization. The main character is a crew member of a panzership who has to make sure a mysterious island is ready for civilization. Dreams and associations again play an important role. Although Fires has a clear story line, Mattotti evades an explicit, chronological story. The inner battle of the main character to change and get out of his strict environment is more important. Graphically the album is a highlight in his artistic career: he worked six years on the book, which resembles a gallery of paintings.

After "Fires" Mattotti earned a reputation of being a master of color in comics. Therefore, the black and white comic "The Man at the Window" (1992) surprised his public. Together with his ex-wife Lilia Ambrosi he made this comic about a man who searches his way in the world and who has troubles with relationships. This semi-autobiographical novel is an intense and sensitive comic in which he uses different outings for pen drawings. He uses lines who as a text tell a story. The story is not so important and completely up to the reader to interpret.

In Caboto (1992), a comic book he drew as a commission from the Spanish government to commemorate the 500th birthday of Christopher Columbus' discovery of America, he tells the adventures of the explorer Sebastian Cabot. The story is poetic in tone and revolves around the fears and dreams of the people involved, including the women aboard the explorers' ship and the impressions the Indians might have had when first viewing the ships. Inspired by 16th century mannerism, he used a different style.

Stigmates (1998) was a new black and white comic with linear drawings, but darker and more nervous than The Man in the Window. It tells the tragic life of a drunk who wakes up one day with stigmata.

Apart from his comics Mattotti found fame as an illustrator. In 2011 Mattotti illustrated The Raven by famed musician Lou Reed. The book was published by the American publishing company Fantagraphics.

His debut as a film director was a segment in the animated horror anthology Fear(s) of the Dark, released in 2007. His first feature film is the upcoming The Bears' Famous Invasion of Sicily, which will premiere at the Cannes Film Festival 2019 in the section Un certain regard. The film is an animated adaptation of Dino Buzzati's 1945 children's book of the same title.

Awards
 1992: nominated for Best German-language Comic/Comic-related Publication at the Max & Moritz Prizes, Germany
 1998: Inkpot Award, US
 2003: Eisner Award for Best U.S. Edition of Foreign Material, USA
 – nominated for the Artwork Award at the Angoulême International Comics Festival, France
 – nominated for Outstanding Artist at the Ignatz Awards, USA
 2017: Lucca Comics, Gran Guinigi for Best Graphic Novel, ITA

Bibliography

Comics
Il Signor Spartaco (1982)
Incidenti (1984) 
Fires (1986) Published in English by Penguin Books
Labyrinthes (1988, with Jerry Kramsky) Published in English by Penguin Books in a translation by Frank Wynne
Murmur (1989) Published in English by Penguin Books in a translation by Frank Wynne
Doctor Nefasto (1989, with Jerry Kramsky) 
Caboto (1992, with Jorge Zentner) 
L'Uomo alla Finestra (1992, with Lilia Ambrosi)
L'Arbre du Penseur (1997)
Stigmate (1998, with Claudio Piersanti)
Dr Jekyll & Mr Hyde (2002, with Jerry Kramsky)
El rumor de la escarcha (2003, with Jorge Zentner)
Guirlanda, (2017, with Jerry Kramsky)

Art portfolios/books
Ligne Fragile (1999)
Posters (2002) 
Angkor: Drawings Pastels Watercolors (2003) 
La stanza (2009), #logosedizioni
Stanze/Chambres/Rooms (2010), #logosedizioni
The Raven (2011), with Lou Reed, Fantagraphics
Venezia (2011), #logosedizioni
OLTREMAI (2013), #logosedizioni
Mattotti Works 1: Pastels (2014), #logosedizioni
Mattotti Works 2: Fashion (2014), #logosedizioni
Vietnam (2014), Louis Vuitton Travelbooks
Hansel and Gretel (2014, with Neil Gaiman)
Blind (2017), #logosedizioni 
Covers for The New Yorker (2018), #logosedizioni (preface by Françoise Mouly)

Filmography
 Fear(s) of the Dark (Peur(s) du noir) (2007)
 The Bears' Famous Invasion of Sicily (La famosa invasione degli orsi in Sicilia) (2019)

References

External links
Lorenzo Mattotti website
Tricromia – Lorenzo Mattotti su Tricromia Art Gallery.

1954 births
Living people
Italian graphic novelists
Artists from Brescia
Italian comics artists
Italian film directors